Steven Goff is a sports writer for The Washington Post, for whom he has worked since 1985 and covered soccer regularly since 1992. He has followed the United States men's national soccer team at five World Cups, and has covered over 100 matches for the U.S. national team. Goff has been the beat reporter on D.C. United since MLS's launch in 1996, and has covered every MLS Cup. In addition to working for the Washington Post, Goff also assisted with NBC's coverage of the 1992 Summer Olympics.
In addition to his works in print, Goff also writes the Soccer Insider blog for the Washington Post'''s website.

Goff is regarded as one of the leading soccer journalists in the United States. Goff was inducted into the Virginia–D.C. Soccer Hall of Fame in 2013.

Goff is a native of Keene, New Hampshire, and a 1988 graduate of American University in Washington, D.C.

References

External links

Soccer Insider Blog at the Washington Post''
 

Living people
American sportswriters
American University alumni
People from Reston, Virginia
People from Keene, New Hampshire
American bloggers
The Washington Post people
Writers from New Hampshire
21st-century American non-fiction writers
Year of birth missing (living people)